The Feminist Writers' Guild was an American feminist organization from Berkeley, California, founded by Mary Mackey, Adrienne Rich, Susan Griffin, Charlene Spretnak, and Valerie Miner. Established in 1978, the group was primarily known for their national newsletter. They aimed to augment the feminist movement of the late 1970s by creating a strong network for women writers to communicate and support each other. They promoted works by women regardless of their age, class, race and sexual preference. The FWG published three times a year through a subscription service and accommodated their prices for unemployed or low-income women.  

According to an interview with Dodie Bellamy, who was once involved with the Guild, many of the members were made up of both poor and rich women—much like a "Marxist community". Bellamy also said that she found herself standing in rooms with many notable women such as Susan Griffin because of the Guild. 

The Guild often partnered with other feminist publications such as 13th Moon—whose editor, Ellen Marie Bissert, was also a member of the Guild.

References 

Feminist organizations in the United States
History of women in California